Right on Crime is a conservative U.S. criminal justice reform initiative that aims to gain support for criminal justice reform by sharing research and policy ideas, mobilizing leaders, and by raising public awareness. Right On Crime reforms are focused on "reducing crime, lowering costs and restoring victims." The initiative primarily focuses on eight issues: over-criminalization, juvenile justice, substance abuse, adult probation, parole and re-entry, law enforcement, prisons and victims. Right on Crime is a project of the Texas Public Policy Foundation, a conservative think tank. After its founding in Texas, Right on Crime has contributed to many criminal justice reforms throughout the country, working with conservative and liberal organizations.

Background 

The Right on Crime initiative began its public affairs campaign in 2010. It was created in Texas in 2007 through a campaign by the Texas Public Policy Foundation in partnership with the American Conservative Union Foundation and Prison Fellowship. Right on Crime's website lists 18 policy analysts, researchers, and law experts. They have helped create reform in 38 states through activities such as "...pass[ing] comprehensive juvenile justice reform bills... clos[ing] prisons, and divert[ing] savings back to the taxpayers and to recidivism-reducing programs."

Marc Levin founded Right on Crime and helped shift the conservative "tough on crime" approach that seeks to expand the criminal justice system into a fiscally conservative approach. He currently serves as the Vice President of Right on Crime and the Texas Public Policy Foundation. Other Right on Crime supporters include Newt Gingrich, Pat Nolan, Jeb Bush, Rick Perry, and more. Regarding recidivism rates, Gingrich and Mark Earley contextualize the problem's magnitude by saying, "[i]f two-thirds of public school students dropped out, or two-thirds of all bridges built collapsed within three years, would citizens tolerate it?" Right on Crime also has partnerships with the Coalition for Public Safety, which contains both progressive and conservative groups with a common goal of making the criminal justice system fairer and more cost effective. This Koch Industries funded organization works to create criminal justice reforms that reduce incarceration rates and end over criminalization, having obtained over $5 million in funding.

According to a January 2011 article in The Washington Post by former U.S. Speaker of the House Newt Gingrich and former California Speaker of the House Pat Nolan, "The Right on Crime Campaign represents a seismic shift in the legislative landscape. And it opens the way for a common-sense left-right agreement on an issue that has kept the parties apart for decades." Charlie Savage of The New York Times noted the conservative movement's growing support for Right on Crime in a Times editorial in October 2011, writing "The [corrections overhaul] movement has attracted the support of several prominent conservatives, including Edwin R. Meese III, the attorney general during the Reagan administration. He is part of a campaign, called 'Right on Crime,' which was begun last December to lend weight to what it calls the 'conservative case for reform.

Beginning in 2011, Right on Crime expanded its campaign into individual states, including Texas, Georgia, Oklahoma, and Florida.

In 2014, the BBC reported that in Texas, rather than building new prisons, Right on Crime has led to the closure of three prisons.

Statement of Principles 
Right on Crime's Statement of Principles has been signed by over 70 conservative leaders. It advocates for cost-effective approaches to criminal justice spending, striving to "produce the best possible results at the lowest possible cost." The statement describes how the current criminal justice system does not work for every offender and may in fact be counterproductive by hardening low-risk offenders. The organization believes that safety is the government's core responsibility, but also describes the importance of upholding conservative values such as a constitutionally limited government. Other values include "...transparency, individual liberty, personal responsibility, free enterprise, and the centrality of the family and community."

The organization's principles describe how the criminal justice system should lower crime rates, collect victim restitution, and reduce taxpayer spending. It describes how the key "consumers" of the criminal justice system, which include the public, victims, and taxpayers, should have a voice in defining justice. They state how the system should reform criminals who will return to society and contribute positively to their communities. Overall, the principles describe how the system should strive to reach all of these goals without expanding governmental power or limiting economic freedom.

Signatories 
Right On Crime's Statement of Principles has been signed by over 90 individuals including:

 David Barton, WallBuilders
 William J. Bennett, former Secretary of Education and federal "Drug Czar"
 Allan Bense, former Speaker of the Florida House
 Matthew Brouillette, Commonwealth Foundation (PA)
 Jeb Bush, Former Governor of Florida
 Chuck Colson, former President and CEO of Prison Fellowship
 Ward Connerly, American Civil Rights Institute and former Regent of University of California
 Craig DeRoche, former Speaker of the Michigan House of Representatives and Vice President of Advocacy and Public Policy at Prison Fellowship
 John J. DiIulio Jr., University of Pennsylvania
 Viet Dinh, Georgetown University Law Center and former U.S. Assistant Attorney General
 Richard Doran, former Florida Attorney General
 Luis Fortuño, former Governor of Puerto Rico
 Newt Gingrich, American Solutions for Winning the Future
 B. Wayne Hughes Jr., Businessman/philanthropist
 Asa Hutchinson, former U.S. Attorney and Administrator of the U.S. Drug Enforcement Administration
 Henry Juszkiewicz, CEO of Gibson Guitar
 David Keene, American Conservative Union
 George Kelling, Manhattan Institute
 Rabbi Daniel Lapin, American Alliance of Jews and Christians
 Edwin Meese III, former U.S. Attorney General
 B.J. Nikkel, former Republican House Majority Whip, Colorado House of Representatives
 Pat Nolan, Justice Fellowship
 Grover Norquist, Americans for Tax Reform
 Tony Perkins, Family Research Council
 Ralph Reed, Founder of the Faith and Freedom Coalition
 Brooke Rollins, Texas Public Policy Foundation
 Tom Slade, former Chairman of the Florida Republican Party
 Larry Thompson, former U.S. Deputy Attorney General
 Richard Viguerie, ConservativeHQ.com
 J. C. Watts, former member of the U.S. House of Representatives for Oklahoma's 4th Congressional District
 Joe Whitley, former Acting U.S. Associate Attorney General and U.S. Attorney

Politics and policy 
Right on Crime supported the First Step Act and cosigned its endorsement letter to Congress, along with 41 other organizations. The act includes programming to reduce recidivism rates and lower mandatory minimums. The First Step Act was approved on December 18, 2018, in a 87 to 12 vote through the Senate. Right on Crime signatory Ken Cuccinelli states that "these common-sense reforms will improve public safety by reducing recidivism and provide a second chance to those who have served their time and who want to live law-abiding, productive lives."

Right on Crime has also written a letter to the House of Representatives supporting the SAFE Justice Act. They say that the act will help increase public safety while reducing taxpayer costs. They advocate for alternatives such as shorter sentences and community supervision.

In North Carolina, Right on Crime advocated for raising the age of jurisdiction in the juvenile justice system. Regarding juvenile justice reform, Marc Levin states that lowering short-term costs through larger caseloads and fewer programs "...contribute to higher rates of recidivism and revocations among 16- and 17-year-olds, leading to higher long-term overall costs." In a press release by the John Locke Foundation, he discusses how sending youth to prison withholds them from reformative programs that could reduce recidivism in the future, incurring higher overall costs.

Statewide reforms supported by Right on Crime have also been made in Texas, Louisiana, Maryland, Oregon, and others. Some examples include:

 South Carolina (2010): Corrections policy reform that diverts nonviolent offenders to community programs instead of prison.
 Kentucky (2011): Passed the Public Safety and Accountability Act, redirecting minor drug offenders from prison to probation.
 Georgia (2012): Reform for community supervision alternatives for low-level offenders.

References

External links 

Prison reform
Crime in the United States
Conservatism in the United States
Criminal justice reform in the United States